Robert Emmett Dolan (August 3, 1908 - September 26, 1972) was a Broadway conductor, composer, and arranger beginning in the 1920s. He moved on to radio in the 1930s and then went to Hollywood  in the early 1940s as a musical director for Paramount. He scored, arranged, and conducted many musical and dramatic films in the 1940s and 1950s and produced three musicals. At the end of his career, he returned to the stage –  where he had begun.

Life and career
Dolan was born in Hartford, Connecticut, the eldest of 12 children. He studied piano with his mother and was educated in Montreal. He received further musical education at Loyola College (now Concordia University), later studying extensively with Mortimer Wilson, Joseph Schillinger, and Ernst Toch. Dolan started out playing piano for honky-tonk dance bands and musical comedy bands, and in the 1920s began working as a musician, composer, conductor, and musical director in the theater. Some of the Broadway shows to which he contributed  were Leave It To Me, Louisiana Purchase, Of Thee I Sing, and Ziegfeld Follies.

In the 1930s, he began work as a composer, conductor, and music director on radio. 

He became music director for MGM in 1941 and then moved on to Paramount, where he was music director for 16 Bing Crosby pictures. He also served as composer and arranger for Ginger Rogers and Betty Hutton, and scored about 60 movies. At the end of his Paramount stay, he was promoted to producer for White Christmas (1954), The Girl Rush (1955), and Anything Goes (1956). 

He joined ASCAP in 1946, often collaborating with Johnny Mercer and Walter O'Keefe in popular-song compositions. Dolan later worked in television; his work included specials and documentaries. He was a prominent member of Columbia University's music faculty, where he taught orchestration, conducting, and a film score class (based on his book, Music in Modern Media).

Dolan married and divorced twice and had one son in each marriage.  His first wife was dancer Vilma Ebsen, the sister of Buddy Ebsen. They were married on June 24, 1933, and divorced in January 1948. Their son's name is Robert Emmett Dolan II, also known as Bobby Dolan Jr, who appeared in The Bells of St. Mary's (1945) as Joseph in a children's Christmas play in the film.  

His second wife was actress Nan Martin. They were married on March 17, 1948, and had a son, Casey Martin Dolan.

Death
Dolan died in Los Angeles on September 26, 1972, of a heart attack during his sleep. Funeral services were held there and at Columbia University in New York.

Filmography
1941 Birth of the Blues – music composer
1942 Henry Aldrich Gets Glamour – music composer
1942 Star Spangled Rhythm – music composer, music director
1942 Once Upon a Honeymoon – music composer
1942 The Major and the Minor – music composer
1942 Holiday Inn – music director
1943 Happy Go Lucky – music director
1943 Dixie – music director
1943 Let's Face It – music director
1944 Going My Way – music director
1944 Standing Room Only – music composer
1944 Lady in the Dark – music composer, music director
1944 I Love a Soldier – music composer
1944 Here Come the Waves – music composer
1945 Bring On the Girls – music director
1945 The Stork Club – music director
1945 Salty O'Rourke – music composer
1945 Road to Utopia – music director
1945 Duffy's Tavern – music composer, music director
1945 Murder, He Says – music composer
1945 The Bells of St. Mary's – music composer
1945 Incendiary Blonde – music director
1946 Blue Skies – music director
1946 Cross My Heart – music composer
1946 Monsieur Beaucaire – music composer, music director
1947 Welcome Stranger – music composer
1947 The Trouble with Women – music composer
1947 Road to Rio – music director
1947 Dear Ruth – music composer
1947 The Perils of Pauline – music composer
1947 My Favorite Brunette – music composer, music director
1948 Good Sam – music composer
1948 Saigon – music composer, music director
1948 My Own True Love – music composer
1948 Mr. Peabody and the Mermaid – music composer
1949 The Great Gatsby – music composer
1949 Top o' the Morning – music director
1949 Sorrowful Jones – music composer
1950 Let's Dance – music director
1952 My Son John – music composer
1952 Aaron Slick from Punkin Crick – music director
1954 White Christmas – producer
1956 Anything Goes – producer
1957 The Three Faces of Eve – music composer
1959 The Man Who Understood Women – music composer

Broadway credits
1935 May Wine – musical director
1936 Forbidden Melody – musical director
1937 Hooray for What! – musical director
1938 Leave It To Me – musical director
1939 Very Warm for May – musical director, conductor
1940 Louisiana Purchase – musical director
1949 Texas Li'l Darlin – composer
1951 Not for Children – composer
1959 Juno – musical director
1959 A Loss of Roses – musical editor
1964 Foxy – composer
1969 Coco – musical director

Other credits
1954 Creature from the Black Lagoon – composer (one cue from Mr. Peabody and the Mermaid re-used)
1955 The Girl Rush – producer
 Of Thee I Sing
 Ziegfeld Follies
 Good News
 Follow Through
 Flying Colors
 Strike Me Pink
 Hot-Cha
 La Rose De France (Paris)
 "Your Heart Will Tell You So" (song)
 "At Last I'm in Love" (song)
 "Little by Little" (song)
 "Hullabaloo" (song)
 "Song of the Highwayman" (song)
 "You" (song)
 "Out of the Past" (song)
 "I Love You" (song)
 "And So to Bed" (song)
 "Glamour Waltz" (song)
 "Big Movie Show in the Sky" (song)
 "A Month of Sundays" (song)
 "Talk to Me, Baby" (song)

Oscar nominations 
All 8 Nominations were for Music Scoring Awards (Scoring of a Musical Picture):
1941 Birth of the Blues
1942 Holiday Inn
1943 Star Spangled Rhythm
1944 Lady in the Dark
1945 The Bells of St. Mary's
1945 Incendiary Blonde
1946 Blue Skies
1947 Road to Rio

References

External links 
  (last accessed May 17, 2006)
 MMM Recordings Dolan bio (last accessed May 17, 2006)

American film score composers
American male film score composers
American musical theatre composers
Broadway composers and lyricists
1908 births
1972 deaths
Musicians from Hartford, Connecticut
Loyola College (Montreal) alumni
20th-century classical musicians
20th-century American composers
20th-century American male musicians